A methane chimney or gas chimney is a rising column of natural gas, mainly methane within a water or sediment column. The contrast in physical properties between the gas phase and the surrounding water makes such chimneys visible in oceanographic and geophysical data. In some cases, gas bubbles released at the seafloor may dissolve before they reach the ocean surface, but the increased hydrocarbon concentration may still be measured by chemical oceanographic techniques.

Identification
In some locations along Russia’s northern coast, methane rising from the sea floor to the surface has caused the sea to foam. However, most methane chimneys do not produce such visible signs at the sea surface. Instead, plumes are identified by a combination of chemical and physical oceanographic and geologic data. Plumes of methane bubbles, whether in the water column or subseafloor sediments, have lower density and sound speed than the surrounding water. As such, these plumes can be imaged by a variety of acoustic techniques, including seismic reflection data and conventional fishfinders. Dissolved methane is usually identified through widespread chemical analysis of water samples, including gas chromatography of gasses extracted from the headspace of seawater samples taken at depth (headspace is the space above a sample in a sealed container, which forms as higher temperature and lower pressure allows gasses to come out of solution). Continuous measurements of methane concentration in seawater can be made by underway ships using cavity ring-down spectroscopy.

Association with climate change
Large deposits of frozen methane, when thawing, release gas into the environment. In cases of sub-sea permafrost, the methane gas may be dissolved in the seawater before reaching the surface. However, in a number of sites around the world, these methane chimneys release the gas directly into the atmosphere, contributing to global warming. Research teams in the Arctic measured concentrations of methane to be the highest ever recorded in the summertime. The thawing underwater permafrost is affecting methane release in two ways: thawing organic matter trapped in the permafrost releases methane and carbon dioxide as it decomposes, and methane in gas or solid form beneath the thawing permafrost seeps up through the now-soft soil and escapes into the atmosphere. In part of a project called the International Siberian Shelf Study that looked at arctic methane emissions, scientists discovered that methane concentrations released from subsea chimneys and seeps were often 100 times higher than background levels, and methane gas has 20 times the heat-trapping capabilities as carbon dioxide.

Marine life 
Methane chimneys play a major role in marine life, creating chemical deposits that are habitat to a plethora of life. These highly productive ecosystems occur in a wide range of marine geological settings across the world. Chimneys teem with organisms that feed on the methane and toxic sulfide that are released from the chimneys. Life surrounding the marine methane chimneys consume 90% of methane released, preventing it from entering the atmosphere. Microbes around methane chimneys form the basis for the entire food web, these microbes are chemolithotrophs, and thus do not require sunlight or oxygen to survive. Marine methane chimneys produce minerals that fertilize the ocean, creating optimal spawning habitats for deep sea sharks and other fish. They are also host to deep sea crabs, shrimp, mussels, clams, and more shellfish.  The expanse of life and ecosystems that these vents provide is still largely unexplored.

Petroleum provinces
In hydrocarbon exploration, gas chimneys revealed on seismic reflection data are indicators of active gas migration and a working petroleum system.

Trees as methane chimneys
Trees in swampy, low-lying areas can conduct methane produced in soils up through their stems and out their leaves. Other plants in bogs and marshes also act in this way. In the Amazon Rainforest, recent studies have named trees a "massive chimney for pumping out methane". Findings estimated that the Amazon Rainforest emits around 40 million tons of methane a year; as much as the entire arctic permafrost systems. When large portions of the Amazon Basin flood, they create ideal conditions for high-level methane production. Trees are not the only plants that act as methane chimneys, however, studies have shown that species with greater root volume and biomass tend to exhibit a stronger chimney effect, and methane emissions in plant species are increased by raising the water table.

Known sites
 North coast of Russia
 Golfo Dulce, Costa Rica
 Bering Sea
 Northern coast of Siberia
 Gulf of Cadiz
 Joetsu Basin, Japan

See also
Clathrate gun hypothesis
Arctic methane release
Methane clathrate
Clathrate hydrate
Runaway climate change
Global warming
Hydrothermal vent

References

External links
IFM-GEOMAR, Kiel, DE Burning ice picture
 Methane Hydrates - discusses U.S. government funding of methane hydrates research
Are there deposits of methane under the sea? Will global warming release the methane to the atmosphere?
Methane seeps from Arctic sea bed
Energy's Most Dangerous Game, Forbes magazine, 2 September 2008
The Methane Time Bomb, The Independent, 23 September 2008
Methane Hydrates: Natural Hazard or Natural Resource?

Environmental issues with fossil fuels
Natural gas